Saint-Ségal is a commune in the Finistère department of Brittany in north-western France.

Geography

Climate
Saint-Ségal has a oceanic climate (Köppen climate classification Cfb).

Population
Inhabitants of Saint-Ségal are called in French Saint-Ségalais.

See also
Communes of the Finistère department
Parc naturel régional d'Armorique
List of the works of the Maître de Thégonnec

References

External links

Official website 

Mayors of Finistère Association 

Communes of Finistère